Zui Ai may refer to:

Love for Life, a 2011 Chinese film
Forget Me Not (TV series), a 2011 Malaysian TV series